Robert E. "Bob" Farrell (December 10, 1927 – August 14, 2015) was an American motivational speaker, author, and founder of Farrell's Ice Cream Parlour and Restaurant.

Early life
Farrell was born in Brooklyn, New York in 1927. His grandfather, Patrick Farrell, owned an auto parts company which his father later ran. Following the stock market crash in 1929 Farrell's father committed suicide. His mother placed 4-year-old Bob and his sister in an orphanage for five years, taking them back when she remarried in 1934.

In 1945 he dropped out of high school to join the Air Force, remaining in the service for a year after the war. He met and married Ramona in 1946; they later had three daughters. He earned a business degree and took a job with Heinz Foods. After a year he became a salesman for Libby Foods.

Ice cream
On September 13, 1963, he and his friend Ken McCarthy created Farrell's Ice Cream Parlour, an 1890s-themed ice cream parlor in Portland, Oregon. Farrell later bought out McCarthy's interest. Within five years he had six Farrell's locations, then began franchising. Among other publicity stunts, he built the World's Largest Sundae for the Guinness Book of World Records. He built up a franchise chain of 55 restaurants, which he sold to the Marriott Corporation in 1972. He remained with the chain as spokesman until 1985. The chain expanded to 120 locations by 1975, but then sales began declining; by 1990 almost all Farrell's locations had closed. In 2008 the chain was revived, with Farrell serving as an advisor to the new owners.

Motivational speaker
While at Farrell's he developed a speech for new employees called Give 'em the Pickle!, based on a letter he received from a disappointed customer. He expanded this speech into a career as a speaker at motivational and employee-training events. In 2002, he put his Pickle speech to video, followed by The Leadership Pickles!

Personal
Farrell was active for decades in Young Life. He resided in Vancouver, Washington until his death due to Alzheimer’s disease on August 14, 2015.

Recognition
In 1976 he received the Horatio Alger Award.

References

American motivational speakers
1927 births
2015 deaths
People from Brooklyn
Businesspeople from Portland, Oregon
Businesspeople from Vancouver, Washington
20th-century American businesspeople